Good King Bad is the thirteenth studio album by American guitarist George Benson featuring performances recorded in 1975 and released by CTI Records in 1976.

Reception
The Allmusic review states "The R&B elements get stronger, the sound and mix are more attuned to the dancefloor, yet this brings out the best in George Benson's funky side. Thanks in part to the more rigid beat, Benson pares down his style to its rhythmic essentials, refusing to spray notes all over the place at random, and as a result, the record cooks and dances".

Track listing
 "Theme from Good King Bad" (David Matthews) - 6:03 Grammy Award for Best R&B Instrumental Performance 1977
 "One Rock Don't Make No Boulder" (Matthews) - 6:50 
 "Em" (Philip Namanworth) - 4:56 
 "Cast Your Fate to the Wind" (Vince Guaraldi) - 7:00 
 "Siberian Workout" (Matthews) - 6:45 
 "Shell of a Man" (Eugene McDaniels) - 5:17 
 "Hold On! I'm Comin'" (Issac Hayes, David Porter) - 5:44 Bonus track on CD reissue, Originally released on the compilation album Space in 1978 
Recorded at Van Gelder Studio in Englewood Cliffs, New Jersey on July 1 (track 3), July 8 (track 6), October 9 (track 7), December 4 (tracks 1 & 2) and December 5 (tracks 4 & 5), 1975

Personnel
 George Benson – guitar, vocals
 Eric Gale – guitar (1-5)
 Don Grolnick – clavinet (1, 2)
 Bobby Lyle – keyboards (1, 2, 4, 5)
 Roland Hanna – keyboards (3)
 Ronnie Foster – keyboards (6)
 Gary King – bass, rhythm arrangements (3, 6)
 Andy Newmark – drums (1, 2, 4, 5)
 Steve Gadd – drums (3)
 Dennis Davis – drums (6)
 Sue Evans – percussion 
 David Friedman – vibraphone (1, 4, 6)
 Joe Farrell – flute (1, 2, 4, 5)
 Romeo Penque – flute (3, 6)
 David Tofani – flute (3, 6)
 David Sanborn – alto saxophone (1)
 Michael Brecker – tenor saxophone (1)
 Frank Vicari – tenor saxophone (1, 2, 4, 5)
 Ronnie Cuber – baritone saxophone (1, 2, 4, 5)
 Fred Wesley – trombone 
 Randy Brecker – trumpet (1)
 David Matthews – arrangements
 Bob James – conductor
 Charles McCracken – cello
 Alan Shulman – cello
 Harold Coletta – viola
 Theodore Israel – viola
 Max Ellen – violin
 Paul Gershman – violin
 Harry Glickman – violin
 Emanuel Green – violin
 Harold Kohon – violin
 David Nadien – violin
 John Pintavalle – violin
 Max Pollikoff – violin

Production
 Creed Taylor – producer
 Rudy Van Gelder – engineer
 Rene Schumacher – album design 
 Pete Turner – cover and liner photography 
 Leonard Feather  – liner notes

See also
Space 
Pacific Fire

References

CTI Records albums
George Benson albums
1976 albums
Albums produced by Creed Taylor
Albums arranged by David Matthews (keyboardist)
Albums recorded at Van Gelder Studio